Merciless is an EP released by industrial metal band Godflesh in 1994 through Earache
and Columbia. In 1996, the EP was reissued along with the Selfless (1994) album as the compilation Selfless/Merciless.

Content
Recorded from 1991 to 1993, Merciless comprises one rerecorded song, two previously unreleased songs, and a remixed song. The EP's title track, recorded in December 1993, is an updated version of a 1986 Fall of Because song. "Blind" and "Unworthy", tracks 2 and 3 respectively, are both labeled as "Biomechanical Mix" in the EP's liner notes, though no original versions are publicly available. This is the same tag that Godflesh frontman Justin Broadrick applied to the remixes he made for Pantera in 1993. Track 4, "Flowers", is a stripped-down remix, or "demix", of the song "Don't Bring Me Flowers" from Godflesh's 1992 studio album, Pure. After the EP was mastered and completed, Columbia brought in Bob Ludwig to refine the release. Broadrick said Ludwig's changes improved the sound.

The EP's cover is taken from the 1943 experimental film Meshes of the Afternoon by Maya Deren.

Critical reception

AllMusic reviewer Daniel Gioffre wrote that the EP "displays clearly that there is method in Godflesh's madness, that their peculiar brand of discord is carefully calculated, in the full knowledge that there is consonance lurking inside every dissonance."

Track listing

Personnel
G. C. Green – bass guitar, production, engineering
Justin Broadrick – guitar, vocals, production, engineering
Robert Hampson – guitar (tracks 3 and 4)
Machines – rhythm, samples
Bob Ludwig – mastering

References

External links
 

1994 EPs
Godflesh EPs
Earache Records EPs
Columbia Records EPs